Danielle Renfrew Behrens, or simply Danielle Renfrew, is an independent film producer with credits ranging from grassroots documentaries to major motion pictures. She has worked with prominent entertainment personalities including Quentin Tarantino, Elizabeth Banks, Courteney Cox, Nick Cannon, and Lily Tomlin. Renfrew is currently head of Animal Pictures, which she runs with Natasha Lyonne and Maya Rudolph. Animal Pictures' releases include comedy special Sarah Cooper: Everything’s Fine and film Sirens, which was selected for Sundance Film Festival 2022.

Filmography

She has premiered 10 films at the Sundance Film Festival, including Grandma starring Lily Tomlin, as well as Kurt Cobain: Montage Of Heck, which received seven prime-time Emmy Award Nominations. Other credits include Lauren Greenfield’s The Queen of Versailles, which was the opening night film of Sundance's 2012 film festival and received the Grand Jury Prize for Directing, Fox Searchlight’s Waitress, and Sony Pictures Classics' November and Groove.

Danielle is a Sundance Women's Initiative Fellow and has served as an Advisor to Sundance's Creative Producing Program and Film Independent's Filmmaker Labs. She launched Superlative in 2016.

Personal life 
Since 2012, Behrens has lived in Boulder, Colorado with her husband, Tom, and two children.

Bibliography

External links

Living people
American film producers
American women film producers
1973 births
Place of birth missing (living people)
21st-century American women